The Polymath: Unlocking the Power of Human Versatility is a non-fiction book by British author Waqas Ahmed, first published in 2018. It argues that specialisation in education and workplaces stifles human curiosity and human potential which naturally transcend subject areas. Ahmed argues that a new approach — one which recognises and fosters versatility — is urgently needed in the modern world. He writes that this would help people both to lead more fulfilling lives and to develop solutions to complex, multi-dimensional problems. The book draws on historical, psychological, and neuroscientific research and profiles living and historical polymaths from many cultures.

Background 
The author Waqas Ahmed is an interdisciplinary scholar, artist, and curator. He is a visiting fellow at the Open University Business School and a faculty member at the London Interdisciplinary School. He is also Artistic Director of the Khalili Collections. With degrees in Economics, International relations and Neuroscience, he has previously worked as a diplomatic journalist and editor (editing reports of the Commonwealth Heads of Government Meetings), investment analyst, and fitness trainer. His initial interest in polymathy was spurred by the way university and his early career pressured him to choose between his multiple interests. His diplomatic career and study of international relations involved a lot of travel, including to cultures in which specialisation was not treated as a default. This led to him studying Western culture's emphasis on specialisation and its polymathic alternatives. He noticed that there was no book-length treatment of the topic of polymathy in English.

Ahmed spent five years writing the book, while doing postgraduate research in neuroscience. As research for the book, he interviewed notable polymathic figures from around the world including Noam Chomsky, Story Musgrave, Douglas Hofstadter, Hamlet Isakhanli, Raymond Tallis, and Nathan Myhrvold. The book was launched at the National Gallery in London during an event commemorating the 500th anniversary of Leonardo da Vinci's death.

Summary 

The prologue is by the Oxford University professor Martin Kemp, author of many books on the Renaissance polymath Leonardo da Vinci. He has been cited as a leading expert on the topic. Leonardo's drawing of the Vitruvian Man, symbolising the unity of humanity and the cosmos, is the book's cover image.

Ahmed takes as his definition of "polymath" those who have made significant contributions to at least three different fields. Rather than seeing polymaths as exceptionally gifted, he argues that every human being has the potential to become one: that people naturally have multiple interests and talents. He contrasts this polymathic nature against what he calls "the cult of specialisation". For example, education systems stifle this nature by forcing learners to specialise in narrow topics. The book argues that specialisation encouraged by the production lines of the Industrial Revolution is counter-productive both to the individual and wider society. It suggests that the complex problems of the 21st century need the versatility, creativity, and broad perspectives characteristic of polymaths.

For individuals, Ahmed says, specialisation is dehumanising and stifles their full range of expression whereas polymathy "is a powerful means to social and intellectual emancipation" which enables a more fulfilling life. In terms of social progress, he argues that answers to specific problems often come from combining knowledge and skills from multiple areas, and that many important problems are multi-dimensional in nature and cannot be fully understood through one specialism. Rather than interpreting polymathy as a mix of occupations or of intellectual interests, Ahmed urges a breaking of the "thinker"/"doer" dichotomy and the art/science dichotomy. He argues that an orientation towards action and towards thinking support each other, and that human beings flourish by pursuing a diversity of experiences as well as a diversity of knowledge. He observes that successful people in many fields have cited hobbies and other "peripheral" activities as supplying skills or insights that helped them succeed.

Ahmed examines evidence suggesting that the developing of multiple talents and perspectives is helpful for success in a highly specialised field. He cites a study of Nobel Prize–winning scientists which found them 25 times more likely to sing, dance, or act than average scientists. Another study found that children scored higher in IQ tests after having drum lessons, and he uses such research to argue that diversity of domains can enhance a person's general intelligence.

Ahmed cites many historical claims for the advantages of polymathy. Some of these are about general intellectual abilities that polymaths apply across multiple domains. For example, Aristotle wrote that full understanding of a topic requires, in addition to subject knowledge, a general critical thinking ability that can assess how that knowledge was arrived at. Another advantage of a polymathic mindset is in the application of multiple approaches to understanding a single issue. Ahmed cites the biologist E. O. Wilson's view that reality is approached not by a single academic discipline but via a consilience between them. One argument for studying multiple approaches is that it leads to open-mindedness. Within any one perspective, a question may seem to have a straightforward, settled answer. Someone aware of different, contrasting answers will be more open-minded and aware of the limitations of their own knowledge. The importance of recognising these limitations is a theme that Ahmed finds in many thinkers, including Confucius, ʿAlī ibn Abī Ṭālib, and Nicolas of Cusa. He calls it "the essential mark of the polymath." A further argument for multiple approaches is that a polymath does not see diverse approaches as diverse, because they see connections where other people see differences. For example, Leonardo da Vinci advanced multiple fields by applying mathematical principles to each.

Throughout the book there are short profiles of historical and living polymaths from many cultures and historical periods, including Aristotle, Nasir al-Din al-Tusi, Ban Zhao, Suleiman the Magnificent, and Florence Nightingale. One chapter is based on interviews with living polymaths.

Reception 
Andrew Hill, reviewing The Polymath in the Financial Times, agrees with the book's contentions that human beings are naturally polymathic and that it is harmful for society to discourage this. Like Ahmed, he decries specialisation for promoting "neglect of hobbies, withering of skills, stagnation of talent, and willful ignorance of wider opportunities." In The Lancet, Andrew Robinson observes that the book is "pioneering" for its focus on polymathy as opposed to the many books that have been written on genius. He agrees with the author that "polymathic versatility has never been more needed, to deal with complex challenges such as climate change". The magazine Jocks & Nerds describes The Polymath as a "fascinating" book that "makes a compelling argument that we should all realise our multifaceted selves and in doing so build a better and more exciting world together". In M3 India, the surgeon Kamal Mahawar describes the book as a "neat and erudite expression of some of the finest thoughts I have ever read". He praises the case Ahmed makes for polymathy both as an approach to personal fulfilment and as an urgently needed set of reforms to education and the workplace. The Globsyn Management Journal writes that Ahmed "has tracked the topmost people in the world including celebrity scientists, historians, philosophers and futurists and has woven together a narrative of history and vision for times ahead so that the existing system of super-specialization can be reversed." BBC Worklife described the book as "one of the most detailed examinations of the subject.

In response to interest in the book from cultural and educational institutions, Ahmed organised a Polymath Festival "designed to celebrate many-sided human potential and explore interdisciplinary solutions to complex world problems."

Editions 
Originally written in English and published by Wiley in print, ebook and audiobook formats, The Polymath has been translated into Korean.

References

Sources

External links 
 Official web site
 Is the era of "specialisation" over? Lecture by Waqas Ahmed at Aarhus University, Denmark (YouTube)

2018 non-fiction books
English non-fiction books
Educational psychology books
Intellectual history
Books about human intelligence
Books about creativity
Wiley (publisher) books